The American Legion Hut-Des Arc is a historic fraternal meeting hall at 206 Erwin Street in Des Arc, Arkansas.  It is a single story rectangular structure, built of saddle-notched round logs, with a side-gable roof and a foundation of brick piers.  The logs are chinked with large amounts of white cement mortar.  The main facade is adorned with a massive fieldstone chimney, and has two entrances, each sheltered by gable-roofed hoods.  Built in 1934, it is the only local example of the WPA Rustic style.

The building was listed on the National Register of Historic Places in 1995.

See also
National Register of Historic Places listings in Prairie County, Arkansas

References

Clubhouses on the National Register of Historic Places in Arkansas
Cultural infrastructure completed in 1934
American Legion buildings
WPA Rustic architecture
National Register of Historic Places in Prairie County, Arkansas
1934 establishments in Arkansas
Works Progress Administration in Arkansas
Rustic architecture in Arkansas
Log buildings and structures on the National Register of Historic Places in Arkansas